Bedlam Productions is an independent film and television production company based in Soho, London and has been in operation since 2009. Bedlam was founded by Simon Egan and Gareth Unwin; the two met while studying film at Ravensbourne College.  Creative Director Simon Breen joined the production company at the beginning of 2010.

History
Bedlam's first major feature production was the award-winning The King's Speech (2010), starring Colin Firth, Geoffrey Rush and Helena Bonham Carter. The critically acclaimed film grossed over $400m at the global box office and won four Oscars including Best Film and Best Actor for Colin Firth at the 83rd Academy Awards and seven BAFTA Awards (including both Best Film and Best British Film). Unwin's work on The King's Speech made him a co-recipient of the Producers Guild of America award for Best Theatrical Motion Picture. In total, The King's Speech won more than 70 awards worldwide in 2010 and 2011.

The King's Speech was followed by the documentary The King's Speech Revealed, which first aired on Five (in the UK) in May 2011. Bedlam had earlier co-produced the BAFTA-nominated Exam (2009 film) (2009), a feature-length thriller written and directed by Stuart Hazeldine.

Bedlam has announced two feature films currently in development.  'The Lady Who Went Too Far', is a story about Lady Hester Stanhope.  The film's screenplay is currently being written by Academy Award winner David Seidler from the biography Star Of The Morning by Kirsten Ellis.  'Zaytoun' is about the unlikely alliance between a 10-year-old Palestinian refugee and an Israeli fighter pilot shot down over Beirut in 1982; the film is to be directed by Eran Riklis.

In June 2011, Bedlam Productions was invited to provide a 'masterclass' at the Sheffield Doc/Fest.

References

External links 
 Bedlam Productions Website
 IMDB page

Film production companies of the United Kingdom
Television production companies of the United Kingdom
Companies based in the City of Westminster